El Rey is a 1984 Latin jazz album by 6-time Grammy Award-winning musician, band and orchestra leader, Tito Puente. Puente's move towards jazz came at the same time as Eddie Palmieri's albums. It includes performances by Tito Puente not only on timbales, but on vibraharp playing a medley of "Stella by Starlight" and "(Tu, Mi) Delirio", as well as "Autumn Leaves" and "Rainfall". There are also excellent, inventive, driving performances of two works by John Coltrane: "Giant Steps" and "Equinox", as well as Puente's own hit songs "Oye Como Va" and "Linda Chicana". Concord Picante records, Concord Jazz, Inc. Produced by Tito Puente.

The 9-piece band includes: Tito Puente on timbales, vibes, and vocals; Johnny "Dandy" Rodriguez on bongos, congas, and vocals; Jose Madera on congas and timbales; 
Francisco Aguabella on congas; Ray Gonzales on trumpet and flugelhorn; Mario Rivera on flute, soprano, and tenor saxophone; Jimmy Frisaura on valve trombone; Jorge Dalto on acoustical and electric piano, and Bobby Rodriguez on bass. All arrangements are by Tito Puente with the exception of "Giant Steps" which was arranged by Jorge Dalto. Tito Puente was born on April 20, 1923.

Track listing
 Oye Como Va - a new version of the 1963 hit
 Autumn Leaves
 Ran Kan Kan
 Rainfall
 Giant Steps
 Linda Chicana
 Stella By Starlight / Delirio
 Equinox
 El Rey del Timbal

References

1984 albums
Tito Puente albums
Afro-Cuban jazz albums